FIRST may refer to:

For Inspiration and Recognition of Science and Technology
Forum of Incident Response and Security Teams
Faint Images of the Radio Sky at Twenty-Centimeters ("FIRST"), a radio survey
Far Infrared and Sub-millimetre Telescope, a previous name for Herschel Space Observatory